Son of Belle Starr is a 1953 American Western film directed by Frank McDonald and starring Keith Larsen, Dona Drake and Peggie Castle. The film's sets were designed by the art direction was by Dave Milton. It was shot in Cinecolor.

Plot

Cast
 Keith Larsen as The Kid  
 Dona Drake as Dolores  
 Peggie Castle as Julie Wren  
 Regis Toomey as Tom Wren  
 James Seay as George Clark  
 Myron Healey as Sheriff Hansen  
 Frank Puglia as Manuel  
 Robert Keys as Bart Wren  
 I. Stanford Jolley as Rocky 
 Paul McGuire as Pinkly  
 Lane Bradford as Beacher  
 Mike Ragan as Earl 
 Joe Dominguez as Pablo  
 Alex Montoya as Mexican

References

Bibliography
  Frank Richard Prassel. The Great American Outlaw: A Legacy of Fact and Fiction. University of Oklahoma Press, 1996.

External links
 

1953 films
1950s historical films
1953 Western (genre) films
1950s English-language films
American historical films
American Western (genre) films
Films directed by Frank McDonald
Cinecolor films
Films set in the 19th century
1950s American films